Quarantine is a 2008 American found footage horror film directed and co-written by John Erick Dowdle, produced by Sergio Aguero, Doug Davison, and Roy Lee, and co-written by Drew Dowdle, being a remake of the Spanish film REC. The film stars Jennifer Carpenter, Jay Hernandez, Columbus Short, Greg Germann, Steve Harris, Dania Ramirez, Rade Šerbedžija, and Johnathon Schaech. It follows a reporter and her cameraman assigned to a pair of Los Angeles firemen who follow a distress call to an apartment building where they discover a deadly mutated strain of rabies spreading among the building's occupants; escape becomes impossible once the government descends upon the building to prevent the virus from spreading beyond it, and the pair continue to record the events that unfold inside, of which the film itself is the result. Quarantine features no actual musical score, using only sound effects, and differs in its characters, dialogue, and explanation of the virus from its source material.

Quarantine was released in the United States by Sony's subsidiary Screen Gems on October 10, 2008. The film received mixed reviews from critics, with praise for its atmosphere and scares. It grossed $41.3 million worldwide at the box office against a $12 million budget. It was followed by a sequel, Quarantine 2: Terminal (2011).

Plot
On the evening of March 11, 2008, news reporter Angela Vidal and her cameraman Scott Percival are filming their report on the night shift at the Los Angeles Fire Department. Two firefighters, Jake and George Fletcher, receive an emergency call from a local apartment building. Screams from the apartment of elderly resident Mrs. Espinosa were heard by the landlord Yuri, his wife Wanda, and other residents: veterinarian Lawrence, opera teacher Bernard, his roommate Sadie, lawyer Randy, mother Kathy, her daughter Briana, and immigrant couple Nadif and Jwahir. The crew enters with police officers Danny and James. They are attacked by an aggressive Espinosa who bites James and Fletcher. Danny shoots her down. The team finds another resident Elise in a similar condition and brings her downstairs with the others. Those wounded by Espinosa become sick and delirious.

The authorities and CDC quarantine the building, not allowing anyone to leave. Angela interviews Briana, who states that her dog is at the vet because he was sick. Lawrence recognizes the symptoms as similar to those of rabies. Angela, Scott, Bernard and Sadie witness a rabid dog maul Randy to death. They are attacked by Elise and Scott kills her in self-defense. CDC officers wearing hazmat suits enter the building to test Fletcher and James, who awaken to attack one of the officers and Lawrence. The surviving inspector reveals that Briana's dog is the reason the CDC has quarantined the building, as it was infected. Briana succumbs and bites her mother before fleeing. The group finds Briana, who is now infected. She bites Danny, which forces the others to rush back downstairs as all the infected break loose. Kathy is killed and Nadif and Jwahir are infected by Lawrence.

The remaining group locks themselves in a room upstairs but discovers both the inspector and Sadie have been bitten. Bernard attempts to escape the building but is killed by a sniper outside. Yuri deduces that the basement, which connects to the sewers, may be the only way out. Yuri is attacked and bitten by the health inspector who has just succumbed to the infection. Wanda refuses to leave her husband behind and gets bitten by Sadie. Jake, Angela, and Scott flee.

The trio manage to find the basement key whilst overcoming most of the infected along the way. Jake is bitten by the infected Yuri, leaving Angela and Scott as the sole survivors. The pair are forced upstairs to the attic apartment by the infected, where they find lab equipment and newspaper clippings belonging to a former tenant, who was a member of a doomsday cult that broke into a military's biological facility and stole a biological weapon called the "Armageddon Virus". The virus is a mutated form of rabies, which is highly contractable and deadly.

A trapdoor opens from the attic and Scott loses the camera light when an infected boy swats at it. Scott turns on the night vision before he and Angela hear banging noises inside the apartment. The source of the noises is an emaciated person, apparently unaware of them, blindly searching.

They attempt to escape but Scott drops the camera as the figure attacks him. Angela retrieves it and sees the infected person eating Scott before she is also attacked. She drops the camera and is dragged into the darkness, screaming.

Cast

 Jennifer Carpenter as Angela Vidal
 Steve Harris as Scott Percival
 Jay Hernandez as Jake
 Johnathon Schaech as George Fletcher
 Columbus Short as Danny Wilensky
 Andrew Fiscella as James McCreedy
 Rade Šerbedžija as Yuri Ivanov
 Greg Germann as Lawrence
 Bernard White as Bernard
 Dania Ramirez as Sadie
 Elaine Kagan as Wanda Marimon
 Marin Hinkle as Kathy
 Joey King as Briana
 Jermaine Jackson as Nadif
 Sharon Ferguson as Jwahir
 Denis O'Hare as Randy
 Stacy Chbosky as Elise Jackson
 Jeannie Epper as Mrs. Espinoza
 Doug Jones as Thin Infected Man

Ben Messmer, who starred in director John Erick Dowdle's previous film The Poughkeepsie Tapes, makes an appearance as firefighter Griffin.

Production

Development
After the success of the Spanish horror film, REC, in 2007, Sony Pictures and Screen Gems had begun working on a remake of the original film. Duo filmmakers John Erick Dowdle and Drew Dowdle were hired to write and direct the film, while Roy Lee, Sergio Aguero and Doug Davison are serving as producers.

Unusually for a Hollywood production, Quarantine does not feature a musical score. The apartment complex was a set but a fully functioning one with four floors.

Filming
Principal photography on their film began in January 2008 and wrapped in March 2008 in Downtown, Los Angeles, California. The film was shot in chronological order and the average shot was between four and six minutes long.

Release
Quarantine was released in the United States on October 10, 2008, by Screen Gems. On its opening day, the film grossed $5,379,867, ranking #1 in the box office. The film opened at #2, behind the second weekend of Beverly Hills Chihuahua, earning $14,211,321 in its opening weekend. It grossed a total of $41,319,906 worldwide against a production budget of $12 million.

Home media
Quarantine was released February 17, 2009, on DVD and Blu-ray.

Reception

Critical response
The film was not screened in advance for American critics.

On Rotten Tomatoes, the film reports an 55% of critics gave positive reviews based on 85 reviews; the average rating is 5.67/10. The site's critical consensus reads "Quarantine uses effective atmosphere and consistent scares to stand above the crop of recent horror films." Metacritic reported the film had an aggregate score of 53/100 based on 14 reviews, which indicates "mixed or average reviews".

Reviewing it in The New York Times, Jeannette Catsoulis praised its "solid acting and perfectly calibrated shocks".

Quarantine received a 3.5/5 stars from Bloody Disgusting, which wrote, "A study in claustrophobia, expertly cast, edited and staged with expert meticulousness and precision, the film’s only major flaw is the need to explain that which never needed explaining." Michael Gingold of Fangoria rated it 3/4 stars and called it "an acceptable substitute" for the original film. Empire was lukewarm in its response but critical of the rushed and copied-verbatim style of the remake.

Paul Nicholasi of Dread Central rated it 1.5/5 stars and called it hard to watch, both because of the shaky cam and the pacing.  Joe Leydon of Variety described it as "a modestly inventive, sporadically exciting thriller that nonetheless proves too faithful to its central conceit for its own good."

Artistic response
Jaume Balagueró, who co-wrote and directed the REC series, expressed distaste for Quarantine by saying, "It's impossible for me to like, because it's a copy. It's the same, except for the finale. It’s impossible to enjoy Quarantine after REC. I don’t understand why they avoided the religious themes; they lost a very important part of the end of the movie."

Paco Plaza stated that Quarantine "helped REC to become more popular than it was. It moved a spotlight onto our film. You know, the fact that it was going to be remade in Hollywood, it was big news in Europe. Everyone knew that it existed, this tiny Spanish film."

Awards

References

External links
 
 
 
 
 
 

2008 films
2008 horror films
2000s supernatural horror films
American disaster films
American remakes of Spanish films
American supernatural horror films
American zombie films
2000s English-language films
English-language Spanish films
Camcorder films
Horror film remakes
Films about viral outbreaks
Films set in apartment buildings
Films set in 2008
Films about firefighting
Found footage films
American mockumentary films
Screen Gems films
Films directed by John Erick Dowdle
Films produced by Roy Lee
Films set in Los Angeles
Films shot in Los Angeles
Filmax films
Vertigo Entertainment films
2000s American films